The Loneliest Monk is an experimental rock duo from Chicago, Illinois USA.

Debut LP 

In 2010 the band released their LP "The Loneliest Monk" on Chicago independent label Kilo Records to positive reviews by critics and fans.  The duo has been on the road with this LP since March 2010, including two west coast tours and one east coast stint. Kilo Records collaborated with HYSTK and Rubbish Films to make a video for their single "The Ghost and the Silhouette", which also received a lot of positive attention.

Discography

References

External links
Official Website

Rock music groups from Illinois
Musical groups from Chicago
American art rock groups
American experimental rock groups
American musical duos
Rock music duos